Peter Öttl (born 24 March 1965 in Berchtesgaden) is a German former Grand Prix motorcycle road racer. In 1989, he won two Grand Prix races and finished the year in third place in the 80cc world championship behind Manuel Herreros and Stefan Dörflinger. Öttl won five Grand Prix races during his career.

He was involved in a serious accident in 1991 at Brno. After Öttl crashed he was struck by Frenchman Alain Bronec and Italian Emilio Cuppini. Öttl and Bronec both suffered heavy injuries as a result.

He is the father of Philipp Öttl.

References 

 

1965 births
Living people
German motorcycle racers
50cc World Championship riders
125cc World Championship riders
People from Berchtesgaden
Sportspeople from Upper Bavaria
80cc World Championship riders